Leptosphaerulina is a genus of fungi in the class Dothideomycetes. The relationship of this taxon to other taxa within the class is unknown (incertae sedis). The genus was first described by Australian plant pathologist Daniel McAlpine in 1902.

Situation: A range of cool season grasses.

Turf damage: Uniform yellow or brown
lesions may extend down to the leaf sheath.
Water-soaked lesions, which quickly fade to
a bleached white, may also occur on the leaf
blades.

Occurrence: Disease outbreaks can occur
during warm, humid weather on fescue,
ryegrass or bentgrass. Large turf areas
become uniformly blighted or appear patchy
with individual leaves dying back from the tip.

See also 
 List of Dothideomycetes genera incertae sedis

References

External links 
 Leptosphaerulina at Index Fungorum

Dothideomycetes enigmatic taxa
Dothideomycetes genera
Taxa named by Daniel McAlpine
Taxa described in 1902